Mount Charity is mountain in Antarctica. It was first seen from the air and named by Lincoln Ellsworth during his flights of 21 and 23 November 1935. It was surveyed by John Riddoch Rymill of the British Graham Land Expedition in November 1936. The mountain was subsequently photographed from the air by the United States Antarctic Service in September 1940, and by the Ronne Antarctic Research Expedition in December 1947. The feature is one of three major mountains in Ellsworth's Eternity Range to which he gave the names Faith, Hope and Charity.

References 

Mountains of Palmer Land